Duality is the debut extended play by the South Korean rapper I.M. It was released by Starship Entertainment on February 19, 2021. The digital EP contains five tracks including the lead single "God Damn".

Background and release 
In January 2021, I.M announced the solo work he had been preparing in 2020 would be released as his first solo album, rather than a mixtape release, with an intended release later in 2021. The EP was released digitally rather than as a physical album to avoid restrictions on its sales by an explicit rating.

Critical reception 

The tracks on the album were noted for all being themed around "duality" (二重性). I.M was noted as "showing versatility as an artist" and "expanding his musical style, when compared to his work in Monsta X". That the difference of his musical style for Monsta X to his solo work, as noted by Ruby C for NME, it was "part of showing the theme of the album", along with the "emotion and delivery of the tracks".

Track listing

Charts

Songs

Weekly charts

Release history

See also 
 List of K-pop songs on the Billboard charts

Notes

References 

Starship Entertainment EPs
2021 debut EPs
Korean-language EPs